Nita Rinehart (born December 8, 1940) is an American politician who served in the Washington House of Representatives from the 43rd district from 1979 to 1983 and in the Washington State Senate from the 46th district from 1983 to 1996.

References

1940 births
Living people
Democratic Party members of the Washington House of Representatives
Democratic Party Washington (state) state senators
Women state legislators in Washington (state)